Ohio Xoggz were an American soccer team that played in Columbus, Ohio. In 1994 and 1995, the team was known as the Columbus Xoggz. The team played their games at Dublin Coffman High School.

Year-by-year

Defunct soccer clubs in Ohio
Soccer clubs in Columbus, Ohio
USISL teams
1994 establishments in Ohio
Association football clubs established in 1994
1996 disestablishments in Ohio
Association football clubs disestablished in 1996
Sports teams in Columbus, Ohio